Incheon International Airport Terminal 2 station is a railway station on the AREX line.

The station opened on 13 January 2018 before the opening of Terminal 2.

References 

Airport railway stations in South Korea
Metro stations in Incheon
Jung District, Incheon
Railway stations opened in 2018
Seoul Metropolitan Subway stations
Incheon International Airport
2018 establishments in South Korea